The Blob is a 1958 American independent science fiction horror film directed by Irvin Yeaworth, and written by Kay Linaker and Theodore Simonson. It stars Steve McQueen (in his first feature film leading role) and Aneta Corsaut and co-stars Earl Rowe and Olin Howland. It was distributed by Paramount Pictures as a double feature with I Married a Monster from Outer Space.

The film concerns a carnivorous amoeboidal alien that crashes to Earth from outer space inside a meteorite, landing near the small communities of Phoenixville and Downingtown, Pennsylvania.  It envelops living beings, growing larger, becoming redder in color, and more aggressive, eventually becoming larger than a building.

Plot
In a small Pennsylvania town, teenager Steve Andrews and his girlfriend Jane Martin kiss at a lovers' lane when they see a meteorite crash beyond the next hill. Steve goes looking for it but Barney, an old man living nearby, finds it first. When he pokes the meteorite with a stick, it breaks open and a small jelly-like globule blob inside attaches itself to his hand. In pain and unable to scrape or shake it loose, Barney runs onto the road, where he is nearly struck by Steve's car. Steve and Jane take him to Doctor Hallen.

Doctor Hallen anesthetizes the man and sends Steve and Jane back to locate the impact site and gather information. Hallen decides he must amputate the man's arm since it is being phagocytosed. Before he can, the Blob completely absorbs Barney, then Hallen's nurse Kate, and finally the doctor himself, growing redder and larger with each victim. Steve and Jane return in time for Steve to witness the doctor trying to escape through the window with the Blob covering him. They go to the police station and return with Lieutenant Dave Barton and Sergeant Jim Bert, but they find no sign of the Blob or its victims. The skeptical Bert dismisses Steve's story as a prank. Steve and Jane are taken home by their parents, but they later sneak out.

The Blob absorbs a mechanic at a repair shop. During a midnight screening of Daughter of Horror at the Colonial Theater, Steve recruits Tony and his friends to warn people about the Blob. When Steve notices that his father's grocery store is unlocked, he and Jane go inside to investigate. The janitor is nowhere to be seen. The couple is quickly cornered by the Blob and they seek refuge in the walk-in freezer. The Blob oozes in under the door but quickly retreats. Steve and Jane gather their friends and set off the town's fire and air-raid alarms. The responding townspeople and police still refuse to believe them. The Blob enters the Colonial Theater and envelopes the projectionist, then oozes into the auditorium. Steve is finally vindicated when screaming people flee the theater in panic.

Steve, Jane and her kid brother Danny are trapped in a diner, along with the owner and a waitress, as the Blob—now enormous from the people it has consumed—engulfs the diner. Dave taps into the diner's telephone with his police radio and warns those in the diner to shelter in the cellar before the police bring down a live power line onto the Blob.

Dave and Bert plan to electrocute the Blob by felling an overhead high-voltage power line. It discharges a massive electrical current into the blob, which is unaffected, but the diner underneath it is set ablaze. When the diner owner uses a carbon dioxide extinguisher on the approaching fire inside, Steve notices that the Blob recoils. Steve remembers it also retreated from the freezer and realizes it cannot tolerate cold temperatures. Shouting in hopes of being picked up on the open phone line, Steve tells Dave about the Blob's vulnerability to cold. The firemen have a limited supply of  fire extinguishers. Jane's father, high school principal Henry Martin, leads Steve's friends to break into the school to retrieve its extinguishers. When they return, a brigade of fire extinguisher-armed students, firemen and police drive the Blob away from the diner, freeing the five trapped there, and surround and freeze the creature.

Dave requests authorities send an Air Force heavy-lift cargo aircraft to transport the frozen Blob to the Arctic. Dave realizes that the cold will stop the Blob but not kill it, “as long as the Arctic stays cold”. Parachutes bearing the Blob on a pallet lower it onto an Arctic ice field with the superimposed words The End morphing into a question mark.

Cast

Production
 
The film was Jack Harris' first production, and was reportedly inspired by a discovery of star jelly in Pennsylvania in 1950. It was originally titled The Molten Meteor until producers overheard screenwriter Kay Linaker refer to the film's monster as "the blob". Other sources give a different account, saying that the film went through a number of title changes (the monster was called "the mass" in the shooting script) before the makers settled on The Glob. After hearing that cartoonist Walt Kelly had used The Glob as a title for his Pogo children's book, they mistakenly believed that they couldn't use that title, so they changed it to The Blob. Though the budget was set at $120,000 it ended up costing only $110,000.

The film was the second feature directed by Irvin Yeaworth. Filmed in and around Valley Forge, Pennsylvania, principal photography took place at Valley Forge Studios. Several scenes were filmed in the towns of Chester Springs, Downingtown, Phoenixville, and Royersford, including the basement of a local restaurant which is today named Downingtown Diner. For the diner scene, a photograph of the building was put on a gyroscopically operated table onto which cameras had been mounted. The table was shaken and the Blob rolled off. When the film negative was printed in reverse, it appeared to be oozing over the building. The Blob was filmed in color and projected at a 1.85 ratio.

Twenty-eight-year-old Steve McQueen received $3,000 for his starring role. He turned down an offer for a smaller up-front fee in return for a 10% percent share of profits, thinking that the film would never make money; he needed his signing fee immediately to pay for food and rent. However, The Blob ended up a hit, grossing $4 million at the box office.

The film's tongue-in-cheek title song, The Blob [Columbia 42150A], was written by Burt Bacharach and Mack David. It became a nationwide hit in the U.S., peaking at #33 on the Billboard chart on November 9, 1958. It was recorded by a studio group who adopted the name the Five Blobs. (The vocals are all by singer Bernie Knee, overdubbing himself.) It's commonly misbelieved that Bacharach wrote the song with his famous songwriting partner, Hal David, but David's brother Mack wrote the lyrics.

The Blob's background score was by Ralph Carmichael, who, like Yeaworth, had worked on television specials for the Billy Graham Evangelistic Association; it was supervised by the director's wife, Jean Yeaworth. It was one of only a few film scores Carmichael wrote. He composed different opening music for the film—a piece called "Violence", intended to start the film on a serious, frightening note. However, the director chose to replace it with the novelty song "The Blob", to encourage audiences to view it as campy fun, and the song has contributed to the film's enduring popularity. The original score and title song were both included on the soundtrack album, which was re-released in 2008 on the Monstrous Movie Music soundtrack label.

Release

Paramount acquired The Blob for $300,000 from Jack Harris and spent another $300,000 promoting it. According to Tim Dirks, it was one of a wave of "cheap teen movies" for the drive-in market—"exploitative, cheap fare created especially for [young people] in a newly-established teen/drive-in genre."

Harris eventually bought the rights back from Paramount and Allied Artists Pictures Corporation reissued it as a double feature with his and Yeaworth's Dinosaurus! in 1964.

Home media
The Blob has been released as part of the Criterion Collection on three formats: LaserDisc (1988), DVD (2000) and Blu-ray (2013). The DVD and Blu-ray feature new cover art by Michael Koelsch. The film, together with Son of Blob, was released on DVD in Australia by Umbrella Entertainment in September 2011. The DVD is compatible with all region codes and has special features including audio commentaries with Jack H. Harris, Bruce Eder, Irvin Yeaworth, and Robert Fields. In November 2016, Umbrella released a 2-disc Blu-ray, The Blob Collection, featuring the 1988 version of The Blob and the 1958 version of Son of Blob. Disc two also includes the Criterion Collection's opening identification, although the release was distributed by Umbrella Entertainment with no mention of Criterion on the disc sleeve.

Reception
When The Blob premiered as the B film on a double feature with I Married a Monster from Outer Space, it was quickly moved up to be the main feature. Audiences liked it, but critics were not as kind. The New York Times highlighted some of its problems and identified some positives, although Steve McQueen's debut was not one of them. On director Irvin Yeaworth's work, they wrote: "Unfortunately, his picture talks itself to death, even with the blob nibbling away at everybody in sight. And most of his trick effects, under the direction of Irvin S. Yeaworth Jr., look pretty phony. On the credit side, the camera very snugly frames the small town background—a store, a church spire, several homes and a theatre. The color is quite good (the blob rolls around in at least a dozen horrible-looking flavors, including raspberry). The acting is pretty terrible itself, there is not a single becomingly familiar face in the cast, headed by young Steven McQueen and Aneta Corseaut".

Variety had a similar reaction, seeing McQueen as the star, gamely "giving the old college try" but that the "... star performers, however, are the DeLuxe color camerawork of Thomas Spalding and Barton Sloane’s special effects".

In a discussion with biologist Richard Dawkins, astrophysicist Neil deGrasse Tyson stated that among all Hollywood aliens, which were usually disappointing, The Blob was his favorite from a scientific perspective.

The film review aggregator website Rotten Tomatoes gives the film a 66% approval rating based on 32 reviews, with an average rating of 6.27/10. The website's critical consensus reads, "In spite of its chortle-worthy premise and dated special effects, The Blob remains a prime example of how satisfying cheesy B-movie monster thrills can be".

Box Office
The film earned $1 million in its first year of release.

Sequel
Beware! The Blob, a sequel directed by Larry Hagman, was released in 1972. The same creature from the original—this time starting as a small specimen unearthed by a bulldozer crew in the Arctic—is brought back to suburban Los Angeles, where it escapes. Presented as a "horror/comedy," the film was also released under the title Son of Blob in 1972. As this was Hagman's first feature film as director, home video releases used the tagline "The Movie That J.R. Shot", a play on "Who shot J.R.?", the famous catchphrase about the near-demise of the character Hagman played in the television series Dallas.

Remakes
A remake with the same name was directed by Chuck Russell in 1988.

In August 2009, it was revealed that musician-turned-director Rob Zombie was working on another remake, but he later left the project. He was replaced by Simon West as director in January 2015. It was announced that the film would be produced by Richard Saperstein and Brian Witten, with the producer of the original film, Jack H. Harris, as executive producer. Harris died in 2017, and there have been no updates as of 2022.

Influence
The opening scene of the 1988 horror-comedy Killer Klowns from Outer Space closely parallels that of The Blob. Both movies also have a decent cop named Dave who does not believe the young people, and a crabby older cop who seems to have a grudge against young citizens.

The 1999 John Lafia film Monster! included a theater scene apparently inspired by The Blob's.

The film Monsters vs. Aliens had characters based on classic 1950s movie monsters including B.O.B. (Benzoate Ostylezene Bicarbonate), an amoeboid creature.

The Carpenter version of The Thing (1982 movie) had a virtually identical shot of a body lying under a blanket on a gurney, where the blanket moves. This matches the scene in the doctor's office with the old man under the blanket.

In the Hotel Transylvania franchise, one of Dracula's friends is a huge, indestructible green amoeboid creature called Blobby, who is able to absorb and regurgitate anything in his path.

In computing, a blob is a collection of binary data stored as a single entity. Blobs are typically images, audio or other multimedia objects, though sometimes executable code is stored as a blob. Blobs were originally just big amorphous chunks of data invented by Jim Starkey at DEC, who describes them as "the thing that ate Cincinnati, Cleveland, or whatever" from "the 1958 Steve McQueen movie", referring to The Blob.

Legacy
Since 2000, the town of Phoenixville, Pennsylvania, one of the filming locations, has held an annual Blobfest, including a reenactment of the scene where moviegoers run screaming from the town's Colonial Theatre, which has been restored. Chef's Diner in Downingtown has also been restored, and is open for business for photographs of the basement on weekday mornings only.

The Blob itself was made from silicone, with increasing amounts of red vegetable dye added as it "absorbed" people. In 1965, it was bought by film collector Wes Shank, who has written a book about the making of The Blob.

According to Jeff Sharlet in his book The Family, The Blob was "about the creeping horrors of communism" defeated only "by freezing it—the Cold War writ small and literal". Rudy Nelson, one of the film's scriptwriters, has denied many of Sharlet's assertions, saying "What on earth can Sharlet say about the movie that will fill 23 pages—especially when what he thinks he knows is all wrong"?

In 1997, film historians Kim R. Holston and Tom Winchester noted that The Blob was "filmed in southeastern Pennsylvania at Valley Forge Studios, (and) this very famous piece of pop culture is a model of a decent movie on a small budget".

The trailer for The Blob is seen during the drive-in scene in the 1978 film adaptation of the musical Grease.

The film is recognized by American Film Institute in these lists:
 2001: AFI's 100 Years...100 Thrills – Nominated
 2003: AFI's 100 Years...100 Heroes & Villains:
 "The Blob" – Nominated Villain

See also
 List of American films of 1958
 Star jelly -  said to inspire movie premise (from 1950 incident in Pennsylvania)
 BLOB (Binary Large OBject), inspired by this film.

Notes

References

Bibliography

 Warren, Bill. Keep Watching the Skies: Science Fiction Films of the Fifties, 21st Century Edition. 2009. Jefferson, North Carolina: McFarland & Company,(First Editions Vol. 1, 1982, Vol. 2, 1986). .

External links

 
 
 
 
 
 "The Blob" Audio of theme Song written by Burt Bacharach and Mack David and performed by "The Five Blobs"
  The Blob (1958) redubbed with a comedy soundtrack.
 The Blob Site – Location tour, trivia, BlobfestPDF
 The Blob: “It Creeps and Leaps” an essay by Kim Newman at the Criterion Collection
 The Colonial Theatre in Phoenixville, PA – An historic, non-profit theatre and location in The Blob
 From Silicone To The Silver Screen – Book about the making of The Blob
 Producer Jack H. Harris interview, July, 2015
 Original soundtrack CD of The Blob produced by the Monstrous Movie Music label

The Blob (film series)
1958 films
1958 horror films
1950s independent films
1950s monster movies
1950s science fiction horror films
1950s teen films
1950s thriller films
American independent films
American monster movies
American science fiction horror films
1950s English-language films
Films about extraterrestrial life
Films set in a movie theatre
Films set in Pennsylvania
Films shot in Pennsylvania
Films scored by Burt Bacharach
Giant monster films
Paramount Pictures films
Articles containing video clips
American exploitation films
Teensploitation
Films directed by Irvin Yeaworth
1950s American films